Bobby Dazzler was an Australian television sitcom produced by Crawford Productions, starring pop singer John Farnham as well as Daniel Rumpf and Darrin Collier as the title characters: up-and-coming pop music stars Frankie Marie Vicars and Bobby Farrell. The other regular cast members were Maurie Fields as Bobby's father Fred, an old vaudeville performer; Shiva Gopalan as The Destroyer; and Olivia Hamnett as Bobby's officious manager, Della McDermott. Qing Ling was a regular special guest star as the singing bartender. It was aired on the Seven Network during the summer of 1977–78.

Etymology 
The English word bobby-dazzler was originally a northeast "Geordie" English dialect term for a person who is considered (with affection) remarkable or excellent, shows smart dress sense or is maybe "flashy".

See also 
 List of Australian television series
 List of programs broadcast by Seven Network

References

External links 

 
Bobby Dazzler at the National Film and Sound Archive

Australian television sitcoms
Seven Network original programming
1977 Australian television series debuts
1978 Australian television series endings
Television series by Crawford Productions